Frank Loria (1947 – November 14, 1970) was an American football defensive back.  He was born in the town of Clarksburg, West Virginia in Harrison County and was a three sport athlete at Notre Dame Catholic High School.

He played college football for the Virginia Tech Hokies football team from 1965–1967, helping the Hokies to a berth in the 1966 Liberty Bowl. Loria was named 1st Team AP All American in 1966.  Loria was named consensus All-American in 1967. He was named to the top six All-America 1st teams. Loria started all 31 varsity games that he was eligible to play in. Loria was known for being a physical hitter and for his quickness. He also had a "sixth sense." Loria had an uncanny ability to diagnose plays and pass patterns.

Loria played safety in the same defensive backfield with Frank Beamer, former head coach at Virginia Tech.  It is indicative of Loria's stature, as well as Beamer's humility, that when Frank Beamer was once asked if he ever thought about "what if" that plane had not crashed, that he replied to the effect that he thought it was quite possible that Loria might be the coach at Tech, and that he himself might be an assistant.

During the 1966 season in a game against Kentucky the Hokies were ahead 7-0 in the 1st quarter. Kentucky was on the 4 yard line trying to tie the score. Loria would sack Kentucky quarterback Roger Walz for a two yard loss. This was a significant in preventing Kentucky from scoring.

In October 1966 against a ranked Florida State team Frank Loria returned a punt 80 yards for a touchdown that would prove to be significant in a 23-21 Virginia Tech victory. Loria also made the game deciding 4th down tackle on a FSU running back on the goal line.

During the 1966 season William & Mary was driving for the game winning touchdown. Frank Loria made a critical 4th quarter interception that preserved the victory for Virginia Tech by the score of 20-18.

In December 1966 the 8-1-1 Virginia Tech Hokies would face the 9th ranked 7-2-1 Miami Hurricanes in the Liberty bowl. The Hokies would be a ten point underdog to the Hurricanes. Loria would play a great game defensively as every time a Hurricane running back hit the line Loria was there to meet him. Loria's efforts would allow Virginia Tech to hold Miami to just 16 yards of offense during the 1st half. The Hokies would still lose a heartbreaker 7-14 to the Miami Hurricanes.

During the 1966 season Loria returned punts 80, 65, and 80 yards for touchdowns. Defensively Loria had three interceptions on the year.

During the 1967 season Loria would return a punt 95 yards for a touchdown against the Miami Hurricanes. It still stands as the longest punt return in Virginia Tech history. Loria would also intercept three passes on the season and rank 8th nationally in punt returns.

Against Kansas State during the 1967 season, Loria intercepted a pass, recovered a fumble, made two touchdown saving tackles, deflected a td pass and had a QB sack for a 9 yard loss.

Loria joined the Marshall University coaching staff as the defensive backs coach.  He died in the Southern Airlines Flight 932 airplane crash, that killed most of Marshall's football team, on November 14, 1970.

His number, #10, is one of only four numbers retired by Virginia Tech. Loria was inducted into the College Football Hall of Fame on December 7, 1999, along with the man he played for, former Virginia Tech Coach the late Jerry Claiborne.  The local Clarksburg Columbian Club honors his memory every year by hosting the Frank Loria Dinner, where the first team All Harrison County football players attend. The Loria award is given to the most outstanding high school football player in the county. Notable guest speakers at the dinner have been Frank Beamer, former Marshall coach Red Dawson, WVU football coach Bill Stewart, and WVU basketball coach Bob Huggins.

In 1984, Loria was inducted into the Virginia Sports Hall of Fame (the state-wide organization that recognizes athletic achievements by state natives, or who those who played or coached for teams in the state).  He was elected to the inaugural class of the Virginia Tech Sports Hall of Fame in 1982.

Bibliography
Turn Up The Wick by Frank Beamer with Chris Colston
Greatest Moments in Virginia Tech Football History by Francis J. Fitzgerald

References

External links
 

1947 births
1970 deaths
All-American college football players
American football safeties
College Football Hall of Fame inductees
Marshall Thundering Herd football coaches
Sportspeople from Clarksburg, West Virginia
Players of American football from West Virginia
Victims of aviation accidents or incidents in the United States
Virginia Tech Hokies football players
Accidental deaths in West Virginia